The Rev. Lucius Doolittle, Church of England priest; born 23 May 1800, died 18 May 1862.

After receiving an B.A. and honorary M.A. from the University of Vermont, Doolittle founded Bishop's College School in 1836 (as Lennoxville Classical School with Cambridge-Graduate Edward Chapman) and co-founded Bishop's University in 1843 in Quebec, Canada. 

He also acted as the Rector of Sherbrooke, the third-largest city in Quebec and the borough of Lennoxville. Bishop's College School is currently the fifth-oldest functioning private school in Canada.

References

19th-century Canadian Anglican priests
19th-century Canadian philanthropists
School founders

1800 births
1862 deaths